Pterostyrax, the epaulette tree, is a small genus of four species of deciduous large shrubs or small trees in the family Styracaceae, native to eastern Asia in China and Japan. The fruit is an oblong dry drupe, with longitudinal ribs or narrow wings (the wings are absent in the related genus Styrax, whence the name Pterostyrax, "winged styrax").

Species
Pterostyrax burmanicus W.Wsm.
Pterostyrax corymbosus Siebold & Zucc. - Japan and China
Pterostyrax hispidus - Japan
Pterostyrax psilophyllus Diels ex Perkins - China

The species names are frequently given with feminine gender ("corymbosa", etc.); however, the genus is correctly of masculine gender.

References

Styracaceae
Ericales genera